Mary Snodgrass may refer to:
 Mary Ellen Snodgrass, American author
 Mary Anderson Snodgrass, British politician, suffragist and advocate for women's rights